

Events

Pre-1600
70 – Siege of Jerusalem: Titus and his Roman legions breach the Second Wall of Jerusalem. Jewish defenders retreat to the First Wall. The Romans build a circumvallation, cutting down all trees within fifteen kilometres.
1381 – Beginning of the Peasants' Revolt in England.
1416 – The Council of Constance, called by Emperor Sigismund, a supporter of Antipope John XXIII, burns Jerome of Prague following a trial for heresy.
1431 – Hundred Years' War: In Rouen, France, the 19-year-old Joan of Arc is burned at the stake by an English-dominated tribunal.
1434 – Hussite Wars: Battle of Lipany: Effectively ending the war, Utraquist forces led by Diviš Bořek of Miletínek defeat and almost annihilate Taborite forces led by Prokop the Great.
1510 – During the reign of the Zhengde Emperor, Ming dynasty rebel leader Zhu Zhifan is defeated by commander Qiu Yue, ending the Prince of Anhua rebellion.
1536 – King Henry VIII of England marries Jane Seymour, a lady-in-waiting to his first two wives.
1539 – In Florida, Hernando de Soto lands at Tampa Bay with 600 soldiers with the goal of finding gold.
1574 – Henry III becomes King of France.
1588 – The last ship of the Spanish Armada sets sail from Lisbon heading for the English Channel.

1601–1900
1631 – Publication of Gazette de France, the first French newspaper.
1635 – Thirty Years' War: The Peace of Prague is signed.
1642 – From this date all honors granted by Charles I of England are retroactively annulled by Parliament.
1806 – Future U.S. President Andrew Jackson kills Charles Dickinson in a duel.
1814 – The First Treaty of Paris is signed, returning the French frontiers to their 1792 extent, and restoring the House of Bourbon to power.
1815 – The East Indiaman Arniston is wrecked during a storm at Waenhuiskrans, near Cape Agulhas, in present-day South Africa, with the loss of 372 lives.
1834 – Minister of Justice Joaquim António de Aguiar issues a law seizing "all convents, monasteries, colleges, hospices and any other houses" from the Catholic religious orders in Portugal, earning him the nickname of "The Friar-Killer".
1842 – John Francis attempts to murder Queen Victoria as she drives down Constitution Hill in London with Prince Albert.
1845 – The Fatel Razack coming from India, lands in the Gulf of Paria in Trinidad and Tobago carrying the first Indians to the country.
1854 – The Kansas–Nebraska Act becomes law establishing the U.S. territories of Kansas and Nebraska.
1866 – Bedrich Smetana's comic opera The Bartered Bride premiered in Prague.
1868 – Decoration Day (the predecessor of the modern "Memorial Day") is observed in the United States for the first time after a proclamation by John A. Logan, head of the Grand Army of the Republic (a veterans group).
1876 – Ottoman sultan Abdülaziz is deposed and succeeded by his nephew Murad V.
1883 – In New York City, a stampede on the recently opened Brooklyn Bridge killed twelve people.
1899 – Pearl Hart, a female outlaw of the Old West, robs a stage coach 30 miles southeast of Globe, Arizona.

1901–present
1911 – At the Indianapolis Motor Speedway, the first Indianapolis 500 ends with Ray Harroun in his Marmon Wasp becoming the first winner of the 500-mile auto race.
1913 – The Treaty of London is signed, ending the First Balkan War; Albania becomes an independent nation.
1914 – The new, and then the largest, Cunard ocean liner , 45,647 tons, sets sails on her maiden voyage from Liverpool, England, to New York City.
1922 – The Lincoln Memorial is dedicated in Washington, D.C..
1925 – May Thirtieth Movement: Shanghai Municipal Police Force shoot and kill 13 protesting workers.
1937 – Memorial Day massacre: Chicago police shoot and kill ten labor demonstrators.
1941 – World War II: Manolis Glezos and Apostolos Santas climb the Athenian Acropolis and tear down the German flag.
1942 – World War II: One thousand British bombers launch a 90-minute attack on Cologne, Germany.
1943 – The Holocaust: Josef Mengele becomes chief medical officer of the Zigeunerfamilienlager (Romani family camp) at Auschwitz concentration camp.
1948 – A dike along the flooding Columbia River breaks, obliterating Vanport, Oregon within minutes. Fifteen people die and tens of thousands are left homeless.
1958 – Memorial Day: The remains of two unidentified American servicemen, killed in action during World War II and the Korean War respectively, are buried at the Tomb of the Unknown Soldier in Arlington National Cemetery.
1959 – The Auckland Harbour Bridge, crossing the Waitemata Harbour in Auckland, New Zealand, is officially opened by Governor-General Charles Lyttelton, 10th Viscount Cobham.
1961 – The long-time Dominican dictator Rafael Trujillo is assassinated in Santo Domingo, Dominican Republic.
  1961   – Viasa Flight 897 crashes after takeoff from Lisbon Airport, killing 61.
1963 – A protest against pro-Catholic discrimination during the Buddhist crisis is held outside South Vietnam's National Assembly, the first open demonstration during the eight-year rule of Ngo Dinh Diem.
1966 – Former Congolese Prime Minister, Évariste Kimba, and several other politicians are publicly executed in Kinshasa on the orders of President Joseph Mobutu.
1967 – The Nigerian Eastern Region declares independence as the Republic of Biafra, sparking a civil war.
1968 – Charles de Gaulle reappears publicly after his flight to Baden-Baden, Germany, and dissolves the French National Assembly by a radio appeal. Immediately after, less than one million of his supporters march on the Champs-Élysées in Paris. This is the turning point of May 1968 events in France.
1971 – Mariner program: Mariner 9 is launched to map 70% of the surface, and to study temporal changes in the atmosphere and surface, of Mars.
1972 – The Angry Brigade goes on trial over a series of 25 bombings throughout the United Kingdom.
  1972   – In Ben Gurion Airport (at the time: Lod Airport), Israel, members of the Japanese Red Army carry out the Lod Airport massacre, killing 24 people and injuring 78 others.
1974 – The Airbus A300 passenger aircraft first enters service.
1975 – European Space Agency is established.
1979 – Downeast Flight 46 crashes on approach to Knox County Regional Airport in Rockland, Maine, killing 17.
1982 – Cold War: Spain joins NATO.
1989 – Tiananmen Square protests of 1989: The 10-metre high "Goddess of Democracy" statue is unveiled in Tiananmen Square by student demonstrators.
1990 – Croatian Parliament is constituted after the first free, multi-party elections, today celebrated as the National Day of Croatia.
1998 – The 6.5  Afghanistan earthquake shook the Takhar Province of northern Afghanistan with a maximum Mercalli intensity of VII (Very strong), killing around 4,000–4,500.
  1998   – Nuclear Testing: Pakistan conducts an underground test in the Kharan Desert. It is reported to be a plutonium device with yield of 20kt TNT equivalent.
2003 – Depayin massacre: At least 70 people associated with the National League for Democracy are killed by government-sponsored mob in Burma. Aung San Suu Kyi flees the scene, but is arrested soon afterwards.
2008 – Convention on Cluster Munitions is adopted.
  2008   – TACA Flight 390 overshoots the runway at Toncontín International Airport in Tegucigalpa, Honduras and crashes, killing five people.
2012 – Former Liberian president Charles Taylor is sentenced to 50 years in prison for his role in atrocities committed during the Sierra Leone Civil War.
2013 – Nigeria passes a law banning same-sex marriage.
2020 – The Crew Dragon Demo-2 launches from the Kennedy Space Center, becoming the first crewed orbital spacecraft to launch from the United States since 2011 and the first commercial flight to the International Space Station.

Births

Pre-1600
1010 – Ren Zong, Chinese emperor (d. 1063)
1201 – Theobald IV, count of Champagne (d. 1253)
1423 – Georg von Peuerbach, German mathematician and astronomer (d. 1461)
1464 – Barbara of Brandenburg, Bohemian queen (d. 1515)
1580 – Fadrique de Toledo, 1st Marquis of Villanueva de Valdueza (d. 1634)
1599 – Samuel Bochart, French Protestant biblical scholar (d. 1667)

1601–1900
1623 – John Egerton, 2nd Earl of Bridgewater, English politician, Lord Lieutenant of Buckinghamshire (d. 1686)
1686 – Antonina Houbraken, Dutch illustrator (d. 1736)
1718 – Wills Hill, 1st Marquess of Downshire, English politician, Secretary of State for the Colonies (d. 1793)
1719 – Roger Newdigate, English politician (d. 1806)
1757 – Henry Addington, 1st Viscount Sidmouth, English politician, Prime Minister of the United Kingdom (d. 1844)
1768 – Étienne Marie Antoine Champion de Nansouty, French general (d. 1815)
1797 – Georg Amadeus Carl Friedrich Naumann, German mineralogist and geologist (d. 1873)
1800 – Henri-Marie-Gaston Boisnormand de Bonnechose, French cardinal (d. 1883)
1814 – Mikhail Bakunin, Russian philosopher and theorist  (d. 1876)
  1814   – Eugène Charles Catalan, Belgian-French mathematician and academic (d. 1894)
1819 – William McMurdo, English general (d. 1894)
1820 – Pierre-Joseph-Olivier Chauveau, Canadian lawyer and politician, 1st Premier of Quebec (d. 1890)
1835 – Alfred Austin, English author, poet, and playwright (d. 1913)
1844 – Félix Arnaudin, French poet and photographer (d. 1921)
1845 – Amadeo I, Spanish king (d. 1890)
1846 – Peter Carl Fabergé, Russian goldsmith and jeweler (d. 1920)
1862 – Mirza Alakbar Sabir, Azerbaijani philosopher and poet (d. 1911)
1869 – Grace Andrews, American mathematician (d. 1951)
1874 – Ernest Duchesne, French physician (d. 1912)
1875 – Giovanni Gentile, Italian philosopher and academic (d. 1944)
1879 – Colin Blythe, English cricketer and soldier (d. 1917)
  1879   – Konstantin Ramul, Estonian psychologist and academic (d. 1975)
1881 – Georg von Küchler, German field marshal (d. 1968)
1882 – Wyndham Halswelle, English runner and soldier (d. 1915)
1883 – Sandy Pearce, Australian rugby league player (d. 1930)
1884 – Siegmund Glücksmann, German soldier and politician (d. 1942)
1885 – Villem Grünthal-Ridala, Estonian poet and linguist (d. 1942)
1886 – Laurent Barré, Canadian lawyer and politician (d. 1964)
  1886   – Randolph Bourne, American theorist and author (d. 1918)
1887 – Alexander Archipenko, Ukrainian-American sculptor and illustrator (d. 1964)
  1887   – Emil Reesen, Danish pianist, composer, and conductor (d. 1964)
1890 – Roger Salengro, French soldier and politician, French Minister of the Interior (d. 1936)
1892 – Fernando Amorsolo, Filipino painter (d. 1972)
1894 – Hubertus van Mook, Dutch politician, Governor-General of the Dutch East Indies (d. 1965)
1895 – Maurice Tate, English cricketer (d. 1956)
1896 – Howard Hawks, American director, producer, and screenwriter (d. 1977)
1897 – Frank Wise, Australian politician, 16th Premier of Western Australia (d. 1986)
1898 – John Gilroy, English artist and illustrator (d. 1985)
1899 – Irving Thalberg, American screenwriter and producer (d. 1936)

1901–present
1901 – Alfred Karindi, Estonian pianist and composer (d. 1969)
  1901   – Cornelia Otis Skinner, American actress and author (d. 1979)
1902 – Stepin Fetchit, American actor and dancer (d. 1985)
1903 – Countee Cullen, American poet and author (d. 1946)
1906 – Bruno Gröning, German mystic and author (d. 1959)
1907 – Germaine Tillion, French anthropologist and academic (d. 2008)
1908 – Hannes Alfvén, Swedish physicist and engineer, Nobel Prize laureate (d. 1995)
  1908   – Mel Blanc, American voice actor (d. 1989)
1909 – Jacques Canetti, French music executive and talent agent (d. 1997)
  1909   – Freddie Frith, English motorcycle road racer (d. 1988)
  1909   – Benny Goodman, American clarinet player, songwriter, and bandleader (d. 1986)
1910 – Harry Bernstein, English-American journalist and author (d. 2011)
1912 – Julius Axelrod, American biochemist and academic, Nobel Prize laureate (d. 2004)
  1912   – Erich Bagge, German physicist and academic (d. 1996)
  1912   – Hugh Griffith, Welsh actor (d. 1980)
  1912   – Millicent Selsam, American author and academic (d. 1996)
  1912   – Joseph Stein, American playwright and author (d. 2010)
1914 – Akinoumi Setsuo, Japanese sumo wrestler, the 37th Yokozuna (d. 1979)
1915 – Len Carney, English footballer and soldier (d. 1996)
1916 – Justin Catayée, French soldier and politician (d. 1962)
  1916   – Mort Meskin, American illustrator (d. 1995)
1918 – Pita Amor, Mexican poet and author (d. 2000)
  1918   – Bob Evans, American businessman, founded Bob Evans Restaurants (d. 2007)
1919 – René Barrientos, Bolivian general and politician, 55th President of Bolivia (d. 1969)
1920 – Franklin J. Schaffner, Japanese-American director and producer (d. 1989)
1922 – Hal Clement, American author and educator (d. 2003)
1924 – Anthony Dryden Marshall, American CIA officer and diplomat (d. 2014)
1925 – John Henry Marks, English physician and author (d. 2022)
1926 – Johnny Gimble, American country/western swing musician (d. 2015)
1927 – Joan Birman, American mathematician
  1927   – Clint Walker, American actor and singer (d. 2018)
  1927   – Billy Wilson, Australian rugby league player and coach (d. 1993)
1928 – Pro Hart, Australian painter (d. 2006)
  1928   – Agnès Varda, Belgian-French director, producer, and screenwriter (d. 2019)
1929 – Georges Gilson, French archbishop
1930 – Mark Birley, English businessman, founded Annabel's (d. 2007)
  1930   – Robert Ryman, American painter (d. 2019)
1931 – Larry Silverstein, American real estate magnate 
1932 – Ray Cooney, English actor and playwright
  1932   – Pauline Oliveros, American accordion player and composer (d. 2016)
  1932   – Ivor Richard, Baron Richard, Welsh politician and diplomat, British Ambassador to the United Nations (d. 2018)
1934 – Alexei Leonov, Russian general, pilot, and cosmonaut (d. 2019)
  1934   – Alketas Panagoulias, Greek footballer and manager (d. 2012)
1935 – Ruta Lee, Canadian-American actress and dancer
  1935   – Guy Tardif, Canadian academic and politician (d. 2005)
1936 – Keir Dullea, American actor
1937 – Christopher Haskins, Anglo-Irish businessman, life peer, and British politician
  1937   – Rick Mather, American-English architect (d. 2013)
1938 – Billie Letts, American author and educator (d. 2014)
1939 – Michael J. Pollard, American actor (d. 2019)
  1939   – Dieter Quester, Austrian race car driver
  1939   – Tim Waterstone, Scottish businessman, founded Waterstones
1940 – Jagmohan Dalmiya, Indian cricket administrator (d. 2015)
  1940   – Gilles Villemure, Canadian-American ice hockey player
1942 – John Gladwin, English bishop
  1942   – Carole Stone, English journalist and author
1943 – James Chaney, American civil rights activist (d. 1964)
  1943   – Anders Michanek, Swedish motorcycle racer
  1943   – Gale Sayers, American football player and philanthropist (d. 2020)
1944 – Lenny Davidson, English guitarist and songwriter
  1944   – Meredith MacRae, American actress (d. 2000)
  1944   – Stav Prodromou, Greek-American engineer and businessman
1945 – Gladys Horton, American singer (d. 2011)
1946 – Allan Chapman, English historian and author
  1946   – Dragan Džajić, Serbian and Yugoslav footballer
1947 – Jocelyne Bourassa, Canadian golfer (d. 2021)
1948 – Johan De Muynck, Belgian former professional road racing cyclist
  1948   – Michael Piller, American screenwriter and producer (d. 2005)
  1948   – David Thorpe, Australian rules footballer
1949 – P.J. Carlesimo, American basketball player and coach
  1949   – Paul Coleridge, English lawyer and judge
  1949   – Bob Willis, English cricketer and sportscaster (d. 2019)
1950 – Bertrand Delanoë, French politician, 14th Mayor of Paris
  1950   – Paresh Rawal, Indian actor, producer, and politician
  1950   – Joshua Rozenberg, English lawyer, journalist, and author
1951 – Zdravko Čolić, Bosnian Serb singer-songwriter 
  1951   – Fernando Lugo, Paraguayan bishop and politician, President of Paraguay
  1951   – Stephen Tobolowsky, American actor, singer, and director
1952 – Daniel Grodnik, American screenwriter and producer
  1952   – Kerry Fraser, Canadian ice hockey player, referee, and sportscaster
1953 – Jim Hunter, Canadian skier
  1953   – Colm Meaney, Irish actor
1955 – Topper Headon, English drummer and songwriter
  1955   – Jacqueline McGlade, English-Canadian biologist, ecologist, and academic 
  1955   – Caroline Swift, English lawyer and judge
  1955   – Colm Tóibín, Irish novelist, poet, playwright, and critic
1956 – Tim Lucas, American author, screenwriter, and critic
1957 – Mike Clayton, Australian golfer
1958 – Eugene Belliveau, Canadian football player
  1958   – Marie Fredriksson, Swedish singer-songwriter and pianist (d. 2019)
  1958   – Steve Israel, American lawyer and politician
  1958   – Michael López-Alegría, Spanish-American captain, pilot, and astronaut
  1958   – Ted McGinley, American actor
1959 – Phil Brown, English footballer, coach, and manager
  1959   – Randy Ferbey, Canadian curler
  1959   – Frank Vanhecke, Belgian politician
1961 – Harry Enfield, English actor, director, and screenwriter
  1961   – Bob Yari, Iranian-American director and producer
1962 – Kevin Eastman, American author and illustrator, co-created the Teenage Mutant Ninja Turtles 
  1962   – Richard Fuller, English lawyer and politician
  1962   – Tim Loughton, English businessman and politician
  1962   – Tonya Pinkins, American actress and singer
1963 – Michel Langevin, Canadian drummer and songwriter 
  1963   – Élise Lucet, French journalist
  1963   – Helen Sharman, English chemist and astronaut 
1964 – Wynonna Judd, American singer-songwriter, guitarist, and actress 
  1964   – Andrea Montermini, Italian race car driver
  1964   – Tom Morello, American singer-songwriter, guitarist, and actor 
1965 – Troy Coker, Australian rugby player
  1965   – Billy Donovan, American basketball player and coach
  1965   – Iginio Straffi, Italian animator and producer, founded Rainbow S.r.l. 
1966 – Thomas Häßler, German footballer and manager
  1966   – Stephen Malkmus, American singer-songwriter and guitarist 
1967 – Tim Burgess, English singer-songwriter 
  1967   – Rechelle Hawkes, Australian hockey player
  1967   – Sven Pipien, German-American bass player 
1968 – Jason Kenney, Canadian lawyer and politician, 18th Premier of Alberta
  1968   – Zacarias Moussaoui, French citizen, sentenced to life in prison related to September 11 attacks
1969 – Naomi Kawase, Japanese director, producer, and screenwriter
  1969   – Ryuhei Kitamura, Japanese director, producer, and screenwriter 
1971 – Paul Grayson, English rugby player and coach
  1971   – Duncan Jones, English director, producer, and screenwriter
  1971   – Idina Menzel, American singer-songwriter and actress
  1971   – Jiří Šlégr, Czech ice hockey player and politician
  1971   – Adrian Vowles, Australian rugby league player and sportscaster
1972 – Manny Ramirez, Dominican-American baseball player and coach
1974 – Big L, American rapper (d. 1999)
  1974   – Kostas Chalkias, Greek footballer
  1974   – David Wilkie, American ice hockey player and coach
1975 – Evan Eschmeyer, American basketball player
  1975   – Brian Fair, American singer-songwriter 
  1975   – Andy Farrell, English rugby player and coach
  1975   – Marissa Mayer, American computer scientist and businesswoman
1976 – Rasho Nesterović, basketball player
  1976   – Magnus Norman, Swedish tennis player and coach
  1976   – Margaret Okayo, Kenyan runner
1977 – Rachael Stirling, English actress
  1977   – Federico Vilar, Argentinian-Italian footballer 
1979 – Mike Bishai, Canadian ice hockey player
  1979   – Clint Bowyer, American race car driver
  1979   – Francis Lessard, Canadian ice hockey player
1980 – Steven Gerrard, English international footballer and manager
  1980   – Ilona Korstin, Russian basketball player
  1980   – Ryōgo Narita, Japanese author
1981 – Devendra Banhart, American singer-songwriter and guitarist 
  1981   – Gianmaria Bruni, Italian race car driver
  1981   – Ahmad Elrich, Australian footballer
  1981   – Remy Ma, American rapper 
  1981   – Lars Møller Madsen, Danish handball player
  1981   – Hisanori Takada, Japanese footballer
1982 – Eddie Griffin, American basketball player (d. 2007)
  1982   – James Simpson-Daniel, English rugby player
1984 – Sham Kwok Fai, Hong Kong footballer
  1984   – Matt Maguire, Australian footballer
  1984   – Alexander Sulzer, German ice hockey player
1985 – Igor Kurnosov, Russian chess player (d. 2013)
  1985   – Igor Lewczuk, Polish footballer
  1985   – Aaron Volpatti, Canadian ice hockey player
1986 – Nikolay Bodurov, Bulgarian international footballer
1989 – Ailee, Korean-American singer and songwriter
  1989   – Lesia Tsurenko, Ukrainian tennis player
  1990 – Im Yoon-ah, South Korean singer and actress
1990   – Andrei Loktionov, Russian ice hockey player
1991 – Jonathan Fox, English swimmer
1992 – Harrison Barnes, American basketball player
  1992   – Danielle Harold, English actress
1994 – Scott Laughton, Canadian ice hockey player
1996 – Beatriz Haddad Maia, Brazilian tennis player
1997 – Jung Eun-bi, South Korean singer and actress
1999 – Eddie Nketiah, English footballer
  1999   – Guanyu Zhou, Chinese racing driver

Deaths

Pre-1600
 531 – Xiao Tong, prince of the Liang Dynasty (b. 501)
727 – Hubertus, bishop Liège
 947 – Ma Xifan, king of Chu (b. 899)
1035 – Baldwin IV, count of Flanders (b. 980)
1159 – Władysław II the Exile, High Duke of Poland and Duke of Silesia (b. 1105)
1252 – Ferdinand III, king of Castile and León (b. 1199)
1347 – John Darcy, 1st Baron Darcy de Knayth, English peer (b. 1290)
1376 – Joan of Ponthieu, Dame of Epernon, French noblewoman 
1416 – Jerome of Prague, Czech martyr and theologian (b. 1379)
1431 – Joan of Arc, French martyr and saint (b. 1412)
1434 – Prokop the Great, Czech general (b. 1380)
1469 – Lope de Barrientos, Castilian bishop (b. 1389)
1472 – Jacquetta of Luxembourg, daughter of Pierre de Luxembourg (b. 1416)
1574 – Charles IX of France (b. 1550)
1593 – Christopher Marlowe, English poet and playwright (b. 1564)

1601–1900
1606 – Guru Arjan Dev, fifth of the Sikh gurus (b. 1563)
1640 – Peter Paul Rubens, German-Belgian painter (b. 1577)
1696 – Henry Capell, 1st Baron Capell of Tewkesbury, English politician, Lord Lieutenant of Ireland (b. 1638)
1670 – John Davenport, English minister, co-founded the New Haven Colony (b. 1597)
1712 – Andrea Lanzani, Italian painter (b. 1645)
1718 – Arnold van Keppel, 1st Earl of Albemarle, Dutch-English general (b. 1670)
1744 – Alexander Pope, English poet, essayist, and translator (b. 1688)
1770 – François Boucher, French painter and set designer (b. 1703)
1778 – Voltaire, French philosopher and author (b. 1694)
  1778   – José de la Borda, French/Spanish mining magnate in colonial Mexico (b. ca. 1700)
1829 – Philibert Jean-Baptiste Curial, French general (b. 1774)
1832 – James Mackintosh, Scottish historian, jurist, and politician (b. 1765)
1855 – Mary Reibey, Australian businesswoman, (b. 1777)
1873 – Karamat Ali Jaunpuri, Indian Muslim scholar, (b. 1800)
1892 – Mary Hannah Gray Clarke, American author, correspondent, and poet (b. 1835)
1865 – John Catron, American lawyer and judge (b. 1786)

1901–present
1901 – Victor D'Hondt, Belgian mathematician, lawyer, and jurist (b. 1841)
1911 – Milton Bradley, American businessman, founded the Milton Bradley Company (b. 1836)
1912 – Wilbur Wright, American pilot and businessman, co-founded the Wright Company (b. 1867)
1918 – Georgi Plekhanov, Russian philosopher and theorist (b. 1856)
1925 – Arthur Moeller van den Bruck, German historian and author (b. 1876)
1926 – Vladimir Steklov, Russian mathematician and physicist (b. 1864)
1934 – Tōgō Heihachirō, Japanese admiral (b. 1848)
1939 – Floyd Roberts, American race car driver (b. 1904)
1941 – Prajadhipok, Thai king (b. 1893)
1946 – Louis Slotin, Canadian physicist and chemist (b. 1910)
1947 – Georg von Trapp, Austrian captain (b. 1880)
1948 – József Klekl, Slovene-Hungarian priest and politician (b. 1874)
1949 – Emmanuel Célestin Suhard, French cardinal (b. 1874)
1951 – Hermann Broch, Austrian-American author (b. 1886)
1953 – Dooley Wilson, American actor and singer (b. 1886)
1955 – Bill Vukovich, American race car driver (b. 1918)
1957 – Piero Carini, Italian race car driver (b. 1921)
1960 – Boris Pasternak, Russian poet, novelist, and literary translator, Nobel Prize laureate (b. 1890)
1961 – Rafael Trujillo, Dominican soldier and politician, 36th President of the Dominican Republic (b. 1891)
1964 – Isaac Babalola Akinyele, Nigerian king (b. 1882)
  1964   – Eddie Sachs, American race car driver (b. 1927)
  1964   – Leó Szilárd, Hungarian-American physicist and engineer (b. 1898)
1965 – Louis Hjelmslev, Danish linguist and academic (b. 1899)
1967 – Claude Rains, English-American actor (b. 1889)
1971 – Marcel Dupré, French organist and composer (b. 1886)
1975 – Steve Prefontaine, American runner (b. 1951)
  1975   – Tatsuo Shimabuku, Japanese martial artist, founded Isshin-ryū (b. 1908)
  1975   – Michel Simon, Swiss-born French actor (b. 1895)  
1976 – Max Carey, American baseball player, coach, and manager (b. 1890)
  1976   – Mitsuo Fuchida, Japanese captain (b. 1902)
1978 – Jean Deslauriers, Canadian violinist, composer, and conductor (b. 1909)
1980 – Carl Radle, American bass player and producer (b. 1942)
1981 – Don Ashby, Canadian ice hockey player (b. 1955)
  1981   – Ziaur Rahman, Bangladeshi general and politician, 7th President of Bangladesh (b. 1936)
1982 – Albert Norden, German journalist and politician (b. 1904)
1986 – Perry Ellis, American fashion designer, founded his own eponymous fashion brand (b. 1940)
1993 – Sun Ra, American pianist, composer, and bandleader (b. 1914)
1994 – Ezra Taft Benson, American religious leader, 13th President of The Church of Jesus Christ of Latter-day Saints (b. 1899)
  1994   – Marcel Bich, Italian-French businessman, co-founded Société Bic (b. 1914)
  1994   – Agostino Di Bartolomei, Italian footballer (b. 1955)
1995 – Ted Drake, English footballer and manager (b. 1912)
  1995   – Lofty England, English-Austrian engineer (b. 1911)
  1995   – Bobby Stokes, English footballer (b. 1951)
1996 – Léon-Étienne Duval, French cardinal (b. 1903)
  1996   – Alo Mattiisen, Estonian composer (b. 1961) 
1999 – Kalju Lepik, Estonian poet and author (b. 1920)
2000 – Tex Beneke, American saxophonist and bandleader (b. 1914)
2001 – Denis Whitaker, Canadian general and historian (b. 1915)
2005 – Gérald Leblanc, Acadian poet (b. 1945)
  2005   – Tomasz Pacyński, Polish journalist and author (b. 1958)
  2005   – Alma Ziegler, American baseball player and stenographer (b. 1918)
2006 – Shohei Imamura, Japanese director, producer, and screenwriter (b. 1926)
  2006   – David Lloyd, New Zealand biologist and academic (b. 1938)
  2006   – Robert Sterling, American actor (b. 1917)
2007 – Jean-Claude Brialy, Algerian-French actor and director (b. 1933)
  2007   – Birgit Dalland, Norwegian politician (b. 1907)
  2007   – Gunturu Seshendra Sarma, Indian poet and critic (b. 1927)
2009 – Torsten Andersson, Swedish painter and illustrator (b. 1926)
  2009   – Susanna Haapoja, Finnish politician (b. 1966)
  2009   – Ephraim Katzir, Israeli biophysicist and politician, 4th President of Israel (b. 1916)
2010 – Yuri Chesnokov, Russian volleyball player and coach (b. 1933)
  2010   – Dufferin Roblin, Canadian commander and politician, 14th Premier of Manitoba (b. 1917)
2011 – Isikia Savua, Fijian police officer and diplomat (b. 1952)
  2011   – Saleem Shahzad, Pakistani journalist (b. 1970)
  2011   – Marek Siemek, Polish philosopher and historian (b. 1942)
  2011   – Clarice Taylor, American actress (b. 1917)
  2011   – Rosalyn Sussman Yalow, American physicist and academic, Nobel Prize laureate (b. 1921)  
2012 – John Fox, American comedian, actor, and screenwriter (b. 1957)
  2012   – Andrew Huxley, English physiologist and biophysicist, Nobel Prize laureate (b. 1917)
  2012   – Gerhard Pohl, German economist and politician (b. 1937)
  2012   – Jack Twyman, American basketball player and sportscaster (b. 1934) 
2013 – Jayalath Jayawardena, Sri Lankan physician and politician (b. 1953)
  2013   – Larry Jones, American football player and coach (b. 1933)
2014 – Hienadz Buraukin, Belarusian poet, journalist, and diplomat (b. 1936)
  2014   – Henning Carlsen, Danish director, producer, and screenwriter (b. 1927)
  2014   – Joan Lorring, British actress (b. 1926)
  2014   – Leonidas Vasilikopoulos, Greek admiral (b. 1932)
2015 – Beau Biden, American soldier, lawyer, and politician, 44th Attorney General of Delaware (b. 1969)
  2015   – Joël Champetier, Canadian author and screenwriter (b. 1957)
  2015   – L. Tom Perry, American religious leader and member of the Quorum of the Twelve Apostles of the Church of Jesus Christ of Latter-day Saints (b. 1922)
2016 – Tom Lysiak, Polish-Canadian ice hockey player (b. 1953)
  2016   – Rick MacLeish, Canadian ice hockey player (b. 1950)
2019 – Thad Cochran, American lawyer and politician (b. 1937) 
  2019 – Jason Marcano, Trinidadian footballer (b. 1983)
2020 – Michael Angelis, British actor (b. 1944)
2021 – Jason Dupasquier, Swiss motorcycle road racer (b. 2001)

Holidays and observances
Anguilla Day, commemorates the beginning of the Anguillian Revolution in 1967. (Anguilla)
Canary Islands Day (Spain)
Christian feast day:
Ferdinand III of Castile
Isaac of Dalmatia
Joan of Arc 
Joseph Marello
May 30 (Eastern Orthodox liturgics)
Indian Arrival Day (Trinidad and Tobago)
Lod Massacre Remembrance Day 
Mother's Day (Nicaragua)
Statehood Day (Croatia)

References

External links

 BBC: On This Day
 
 Historical Events on May 30

Days of the year
May